Callen Radcliffe Tjader Jr. (July 16, 1925 – May 5, 1982) was an American Latin Jazz musician, known as the most successful non-Latino Latin musician. He explored other jazz idioms, even as he continued to perform music of Afro-Jazz, the Caribbean, México and Latin America.

Cal Tjader played the vibraphone primarily, but was accomplished on the drums, bongos, congas, timpani, and the piano. He worked with many musicians from several cultures. He is often linked to the development of Latin rock and acid jazz. Although fusing Jazz with Latin music is often categorized as "Latin Jazz", Tjader's works swung freely between both styles. His Grammy award in 1980 for his album La Onda Va Bien capped off a career that spanned over forty years.

Early years (1925–1943)
Callen Radcliffe Tjader Jr. was born July 16, 1925, in St. Louis to touring Swedish American vaudevillians. His father tap danced and his mother played piano, a husband-wife team going from city to city with their troupe to earn a living. When he was two, Tjader's parents settled in San Mateo, California, and opened a dance studio. His mother (who dreamed of becoming a concert pianist) instructed him in classical piano and his father taught him to tap dance. He performed around the Bay Area as "Tjader Junior", a tap-dancing wunderkind. He performed a brief non-speaking role dancing alongside Bill "Bojangles" Robinson in the film The White of the Dark Cloud of Joy.

He joined a Dixieland band and played around the Bay Area. At age sixteen, he entered a Gene Krupa drum solo contest, making it to the finals and ultimately winning by playing "Drum Boogie". The win was overshadowed by that morning's event: Japanese planes had bombed Pearl Harbor.

Navy and college (1940s)
Tjader entered the United States Navy in 1943 at age 17 and served as a medical corpsman in the Pacific Theater until March 1946. He saw action in five invasions, including the Marianas campaign and the Battle of the Philippines. Upon his return he enrolled at San Jose State College (now San José State University) under the G.I. Bill, majoring in education. Later he transferred to San Francisco State College, still intending to teach. It was there he took timpani lessons, his only formal music training. 

At San Francisco State, he met Dave Brubeck, a young pianist also fresh from a stint in the Army. Brubeck introduced Tjader to Paul Desmond. The three connected with more players and formed the Dave Brubeck Octet with Tjader on drums. Although the group recorded only one album and had difficulty finding work, the recording is regarded as important due to its early glimpse at these soon-to-be-legendary jazz greats. After the octet disbanded, Tjader and Brubeck formed a trio, performing jazz standards in the hope of finding more work. The Dave Brubeck Trio succeeded and became a fixture in the San Francisco jazz scene. Tjader taught himself the vibraphone during this period, alternating between it and the drums depending on the song.

Sideman (1951–1954)
Brubeck suffered major injuries in a diving accident in 1951 in Hawaii and the trio was forced to dissolve. Tjader continued the trio work in California with bassist Jack Weeks from Brubeck's trio and pianists John Marabuto or Vince Guaraldi, recording his first 10" LP as a leader with them for Fantasy, but soon worked with Alvino Rey and completed his degree at San Francisco State. Jazz pianist George Shearing recruited Tjader in 1953 when Joe Roland left his group. Al McKibbon was a member of Shearing's band at the time and he and Tjader encouraged Shearing to add Cuban percussionists. Tjader played bongos as well as the vibes: "Drum Trouble" was his bongo solo feature. Down Beat's 1953 Critics Poll nominated him as best New Star on the vibes. His next 10" LP as a leader was recorded for Savoy during that time, as well as his first Latin Jazz for a Fantasy 10" LP. While in New York City, bassist Al McKibbon took Tjader to see the Afro-Cuban big bands led by Machito and Chico O'Farrill, both at the forefront of the nascent Latin jazz sound. In New York he met Mongo Santamaría and Willie Bobo who were members of Tito Puente's orchestra at the time.

Leader (1954–1962)
Tjader soon quit Shearing after a gig at the San Francisco jazz club the Blackhawk. In April 1954, he formed the Cal Tjader Modern Mambo Quintet. The members were brothers Manuel Duran and Carlos Duran on piano and bass respectively, Benny Velarde on timbales, bongos, and congas, and Edgard Rosales on congas (Luis Miranda replaced Rosales after the first year). Back in San Francisco and recording for Fantasy Records, the group produced several albums in rapid succession, including Mambo with Tjader.

The Mambo craze reached its pitch in the late 1950s, a boon to Tjader's career. Unlike the exotica of Martin Denny and Les Baxter, music billed as "impressions of" Oceania (and other locales), Tjader's bands featured seasoned Cuban players and top-notch jazz talent conversant in both idioms. He cut several notable straight-ahead jazz albums for Fantasy using various group names, most notably the Cal Tjader Quartet (composed of bassist Gene Wright, drummer Al Torre, and pianist Vince Guaraldi). Tjader is sometimes lumped in as part of the West Coast (or "cool") jazz sound, although his rhythms and tempos (both Latin and bebop) had little in common with the work of Los Angeles jazzmen Gerry Mulligan, Chet Baker, or Art Pepper. 

Tjader and his band opened the second Monterey Jazz Festival in 1959 with an acclaimed "preview" concert.  The first festival had suffered financially. Tjader is credited with bringing in big ticket sales for the second and saving the landmark festival before it had even really started. The Modern Mambo Quintet disbanded within a couple of years. Tjader formed several more small-combo bands, playing regularly at such San Francisco jazz clubs as the Blackhawk.

Verve and Skye Records (1960s)
After recording for Fantasy for nearly a decade, Tjader signed with better-known Verve Records, founded by Norman Granz but owned then by MGM.  With the luxury of larger budgets and seasoned recording producer Creed Taylor in the control booth, Tjader cut a varied string of albums. During the Verve years Tjader worked with arrangers Oliver Nelson, Claus Ogerman, Eddie Palmieri, Lalo Schifrin, Don Sebesky, and performers Willie Bobo, Donald Byrd, Clare Fischer, a young Chick Corea, Jimmy Heath, Kenny Burrell, Hank Jones, Anita O'Day, Armando Peraza, Jerome Richardson and others. Tjader recorded with big band orchestras for the first time, and even made an album based on Asian scales and rhythms. 

His biggest success was the album Soul Sauce (1964). Its title track, a Dizzy Gillespie cover Tjader had been toying with for over a decade, was a radio hit (hitting the top 20 on New York's influential pop music station WMCA in May 1965), and landed the album on Billboard's Top 50 Albums of 1965. Titled "Guachi Guaro" (a nonsensical phrase in Spanish), Tjader transformed the Gillespie/Chano Pozo composition into something new. (The name "Soul Sauce" came from Taylor's suggestion for a catchier title and Willie Bobo’s observation that Tjader's version was spicier than the original.) The song's identifiable sound is a combination of the call-outs made by Bobo ("Salsa ahi na ma ... sabor, sabor!") and Tjader's crisp vibes work. The album sold over 100,000 copies and popularized the word salsa in describing Latin dance music. 

The 1960s were Tjader's most prolific period.  With the backing of a major record label, Verve, he could afford to stretch out and expand his repertoire.  The most obvious deviation from his Latin jazz sound was Several Shades of Jade (1963) and the follow-up Breeze From the East (1963). Both albums attempted to combine jazz and Asian music, much as Tjader and others had done with Afro-Cuban. The result was dismissed by the critics, chided as little more than the dated exotica that had come and gone in the prior decade.

Other experiments were not so easily dismissed. Tjader teamed up with New Yorker Eddie Palmieri in 1966 to produce El Sonido Nuevo ("The New Sound"). A companion LP was recorded for Palmieri's contract label, Tico, titled Bamboleate. While Tjader's prior work was often dismissed as "Latin lounge", here the duo created a darker, more sinister sound. Cal Tjader Plays The Contemporary Music Of Mexico And Brazil (1962), released during the bossa nova craze, actually bucked the trend, instead using more traditional arrangements from the two countries' past. In the late 1960s Tjader, along with guitarist Gábor Szabó and Gary McFarland, helped to found the short-lived Skye record label. Tjader's work of this period is characterized by  Solar Heat (1968) and Tjader Plugs In (1969), precursors to acid jazz.

Fusion years (1970s)
During the 1970s Tjader returned to Fantasy Records, the label he began with in 1954. Embracing the jazz fusion sound that was becoming its own subgenre at the time, he added electronic instruments to his lineup and began to employ rock beats behind his arrangements. His most notable album during this period is Amazonas (1975) (produced by Brazilian percussionist Airto Moreira). He played on the soundtrack to the 1972 animated film Fritz the Cat, most notably on the track entitled "Mamblues". In 1976, Tjader recorded several live shows performed at Grace Cathedral, San Francisco. Like the Monterey Jazz Festival show, he played a mix of jazz standards and Latin arrangements. Later he toured Japan with saxophonist Art Pepper, the latter recovering from alcohol and drug dependencies.

Final years (1979 to 1982)
Carl Jefferson, president of Concord Records, created a subsidiary label called Concord Picante to promote and distribute Tjader's work. Unlike his excursions in the 1960s and his jazz-rock attempts in the 1970s, Tjader's Concord Picante work was largely straight-ahead Latin jazz.  Electronic instruments and rock backbeats were dropped, reverting to a more "classic" sound. During the prior decade he'd built up a top-notch crew of young musicians, his best lineup since his Modern Mambo Quintet of the 1950s, with Mark Levine on piano, Roger Glenn on flute, Vince Lateano on drums, Robb Fisher on the bass, and Poncho Sanchez on the congas. 

Tjader cut five albums for Concord Picante, the most successful being La Onda Va Bien (1979) (roughly "The Good Life"), produced by Carl Jefferson and Frank Dorritie, which earned a Grammy award in 1980 for Best Latin Recording. The A section of Tjader's "Sabor" is a 2-3 onbeat/offbeat guajeo, minus some notes.

Tjader died on tour. On the road with his band in Manila, he collapsed from a heart attack and died on May 5, 1982, aged 56.

Tjader's legacy is associated with that of Gábor Szabó and Gary McFarland, who worked and founded Skye Records together (the PANDORA archive spells Szabó without the acute accent). The American hip-hop band A Tribe Called Quest sampled songs from Cal's "Aquarius" (from The Prophet) as an outro to most of the songs on their album Midnight Marauders. According to WhoSampled.com, over 170 tracks have sampled Tjader's work.

Discography

Albums 
The Cal Tjader Trio (Fantasy, 1953) – recorded in 1951
Cal Tjader: Vibist (Savoy, 1954)
Cal Tjader Plays Afro-Cuban (Fantasy, 1954)
Tjader Plays Mambo (Fantasy, 1954)
Mambo with Tjader (Fantasy, 1954)
Tjader Plays Tjazz (Fantasy, 1955)
Ritmo Caliente! (Fantasy, 1955)
Cal Tjader Quartet (Fantasy, 1956)
The Cal Tjader Quintet (Fantasy, 1956)
Jazz at the Blackhawk (Fantasy, 1957)
Cal Tjader's Latin Kick (Fantasy, 1957)
Cal Tjader (Fantasy, 1957)
Más Ritmo Caliente (Fantasy, 1958)
Cal Tjader-Stan Getz Sextet (Fantasy, 1958) with Stan Getz
San Francisco Moods (Fantasy, 1958)
Cal Tjader's Latin Concert (Fantasy, 1958)
Latin for Lovers: Cal Tjader with Strings (Fantasy, 1958)
Latin for Dancers (Fantasy, 1958) compilation
A Night at the Blackhawk (Fantasy, 1958)
Tjader Goes Latin (Fantasy, 1958)
Concert by the Sea, Vol. 1 (Fantasy, 1959)
Concert by the Sea, Vol. 2 (Fantasy, 1959)
Concert on the Campus (Fantasy, 1960)
Demasiado Caliente (Fantasy, 1960)
West Side Story (Fantasy, 1960)
In a Latin Bag (Verve, 1961)
Live and Direct (Fantasy, 1962)
Cal Tjader Plays, Mary Stallings Sings (Fantasy, 1962) with Mary Stallings
Cal Tjader Plays Harold Arlen (Fantasy, 1962)
Latino (Fantasy, 1962)
Saturday Night/Sunday Night at the Blackhawk, San Francisco (Verve, 1962)
Cal Tjader Plays the Contemporary Music of Mexico and Brazil (Verve, 1962)
Time for 2 (Verve, 1962) with Anita O'Day
Several Shades of Jade (Verve, 1963)
Soña Libré (Verve, 1963)
Breeze from the East (Verve, 1964)
Warm Wave (Verve, 1964)
Soul Sauce (Verve, 1964)
Soul Bird: Whiffenpoof (Verve, 1965)
Soul Burst (Verve, 1966)
El Sonido Nuevo (Verve, 1966) with Eddie Palmieri
Bamboléate (Tico Records, 1967) with Eddie Palmieri
Along Comes Cal (Verve, 1967)
Hip Vibrations (Verve, 1967)
The Prophet (Verve, 1968)
Solar Heat (Skye, 1968)
Cal Tjader Sounds Out Burt Bacharach (Skye, 1969)
Cal Tjader Plugs In (At The Lighthouse, Hermosa Beach, California, February 20–21, 1969) (Skye, 1969)
Tjader (Fantasy, 1970)
Agua Dulce (Fantasy, 1971)
Descarga (Fantasy, 1971)
Live at the Funky Quarters (Fantasy, 1972)
Doxy (Verve, 1973)
Primo (Fantasy, 1973)
Last Bolero in Berkeley (Fantasy, 1973)
Tambu (Fantasy, 1973) with Charlie Byrd
Puttin' It Together: Recorded Live at Concerts By the Sea (Fantasy, 1973)
Last Night When We Were Young (Fantasy, 1975)
Amazonas (Fantasy, 1975)
Grace Cathedral Concert (Fantasy, 1976)
Guarabe (Fantasy, 1977)
Breathe Easy (Galaxy, 1977)
Here [live] (Galaxy, 1977)
Huracán (Crystal Clear, 1978; reissue: Laserlight, 1990)
La Onda Va Bien (Concord Picante, 1979)
Gózame! Pero Ya (Concord Picante, 1980)
The Shining Sea (Concord Picante, 1981)
A Fuego Vivo (Concord Picante, 1981)
Heat Wave (Concord Jazz, 1982) with Carmen McRae
Good Vibes (Concord Picante, 1984; recorded 1981)
Latin + Jazz = Cal Tjader (Dunhill Compact Classics/DCC, 1990) – recorded in 1968 (Skye)
Concerts in the Sun (Fantasy, 2002) – recorded in 1960
Cuban Fantasy (Fantasy, 2003) – live recorded in 1977
Live at the Monterey Jazz Festival 1958–1980 (Concord Jazz, 2008)

With Ed Bogas
Fritz the Cat (soundtrack) (Fantasy, 1972)

With Dave Brubeck
Dave Brubeck Octet (Fantasy, 1956) – recorded in 1946–50
Dave Brubeck Trio (Fantasy, 1950)
Distinctive Rhythm Instrumentals (Fantasy, 1950)

With Rosemary Clooney
With Love (Concord Jazz, 1981)
Rosemary Clooney Sings the Music of Cole Porter (Concord Jazz, 1982)

With Dizzy Gillespie
Highlights of the 18th Annual Monterey Jazz Festival 1975 (Storyville DVD, 2007)

With Woody Herman
Woody Herman Presents: A Concord Jam, Volume 1 (Concord Jazz, 1981)

With Eiji Kitamura
Seven Stars (Concord Jazz, 1981)

With Charles Mingus
Charles 'Barron' Mingus, West Coast, 1945-49 (Uptown, 2002)

With Toshiyuki Miyama
The New Herd at Monterey (Nadja [Japan], 1974)

With Brew Moore
The Brew Moore Quintet (Fantasy, 1956)
Brew Moore (Fantasy, 1957)

With Vido Musso
Vido Musso Sextet (Fantasy, 1952)

With Art Pepper
Tokyo Debut [live] (Galaxy, 1995]) – recorded in 1977

With Armando Peraza
Wild Thing (Skye, 1969)

With Tito Puente
Tito Puente & His Orchestra Live at the 1977 Monterey Jazz Festival (Concord Jazz, 2008)

With George Shearing
An Evening with the George Shearing Quintet (MGM, 1954)
A Shearing Caravan (MGM, 1955)
When Lights are Low (MGM, 1955)
Shearing in Hi-Fi (MGM, 1955)

Tribute albums
Louie Ramirez: Tribute to Cal Tjader (Caimán, 1986)
Clare Fischer: Tjaderama (Discovery, 1987)
Poncho Sanchez: Soul Sauce: Memories of Cal Tjader (Concord Jazz, 1995)
Dave Samuels: Tjader-ized : A Cal Tjader Tribute (Verve, 1998)
Gary Burton: For Hamp, Red, Bags, and Cal (Concord Jazz, 2001)
Paquito D'Rivera and his Latin Jazz Ensemble with Louie Ramírez: A Tribute to Cal Tjader (Yemayá, 2003)
Mike Freeman ZonaVibe ''"Blue Tjade" (VOF Recordings, 2015)

Notes

References

External links

 – official site

Cal Tjader complete discography from Music City
Cal Tjader at Space Age Pop
Early Tales and Sketches (excerpt), referring to Dr. Anton Tjader

1925 births
1982 deaths
Cool jazz drummers
Latin jazz musicians
Latin jazz pianists
Bossa nova pianists
Jazz percussionists
American jazz vibraphonists
American jazz drummers
Jazz musicians from California
American people of Swedish descent
San Francisco State University alumni
Musicians from St. Louis
United States Army personnel of World War II
United States Army soldiers
Grammy Award winners
Savoy Records artists
Skye Records artists
Concord Records artists
Galaxy Records artists
American percussionists
20th-century American drummers
American male drummers
American multi-instrumentalists
Jazz musicians from Missouri
Male pianists
20th-century pianists
20th-century American male musicians
American male jazz musicians
Jazz vibraphonists